Mattia (also Matija) Prskalo (born 14 July 1986) is a male model from Sweden.
He is represented by the Le Management in Stockholm and numerous international agencies.

He is one of the models in Swedish Television featured series Modellpojkar season 2.

References

Swedish male models
1986 births
Living people
Swedish people of Bosnia and Herzegovina descent